Ericleia Bodziak (26 September 1969), also known as Filó, is a retired Brazilian female volleyball player. She participated in the 1996 Summer Olympics where she won a bronze medal with the Brazilian women's national volleyball team. She is currently married to Daniele Giorgi and has a daughter named Yasmin.

Clubs

References 

1969 births
Living people
Brazilian women's volleyball players
Olympic volleyball players of Brazil
Volleyball players at the 1996 Summer Olympics
Medalists at the 1996 Summer Olympics
Sportspeople from Curitiba
Olympic bronze medalists for Brazil
Olympic medalists in volleyball